Jegurupadu is a village near mandal headquarters Kadiam, Kadiam mandal, Rajahmundry in East Godavari district of Andhra Pradesh, India.

Geography

References

External links
 Kadiyam website

Villages in Kadiam mandal